Ralph Lars Herseth (born June 16, 1946) is an American former politician. He served in the South Dakota House of Representatives from 1979 to 1986 and in the Senate from 1989 to 1996. He was the son of Ralph and Lorna Herseth.

References

External links

1946 births
Living people
Democratic Party members of the South Dakota House of Representatives
Democratic Party South Dakota state senators
Herseth family
Politicians from Aberdeen, South Dakota